Geliebte Schwestern is a German television series.

See also
List of German television series

External links
 

1997 German television series debuts
1998 German television series endings
German medical television series
Television shows set in Berlin
German-language television shows
Sat.1 original programming